Urosalpinx aspinosus is an extinct species of sea snail, a marine gastropod mollusk in the family Muricidae, the murex snails or rock snails.

Description
The length of the shell attains 10 mm.

Distribution
Fossils were found in Oligocene strata of Mississippi, USA.

References

External links
 Harnik, Paul G. ; Macroecological drivers of extinction risk in early Cenozoic  mollusks; The University of Chicago ProQuest Dissertations Publishing,  2009. 3369451.

aspinosus
Gastropods described in 1886
Oligocene gastropods